Adut Akech Bior (born 25 December 1999) is a South Sudanese-Australian model. Akech made her fashion week runway debut as an exclusive in the Saint Laurent S/S 17 show and went on to close both their F/W 17 and S/S 18 shows as an exclusive. In 2018, she was chosen as "Model of the Year" by models.com, an honour which was repeated the next year.

Early life 
Akech was born in South Sudan (formerly part of Sudan), but was raised in Kakuma, Kenya. She was 7 years old when she moved away from Kenya along with her mother to Adelaide, Australia as South Sudanese refugees. Akech has five siblings. Akech was known as "Mary" in Adelaide, as Australian teachers found it difficult to pronounce her name.

Career
Akech was introduced to the fashion industry by her family, and despite getting scouted multiple times by local modelling agencies when she was 13 and 14 years old, she started her modelling career at 16 years old, signing to her mother agency, Chadwick Models, in Sydney, Australia. Within the fashion industry, she prefers her birth name, Adut.

Akech's runway debut was in a local fashion show, put together by her aunt. She then went on doing Melbourne Fashion Week, where she took digitals for a Saint Laurent casting in Paris Fashion Week. After Melbourne Fashion Week, back home in Adelaide, she got a call from her agent confirming her for the Saint Laurent show, and took a flight to Paris a day after, making her major Fashion Week debut at Saint Laurent's S/S 17 show and signing to Elite Model Management in Paris. Since then, Akech has done 4 campaigns and closed 2 shows for Saint Laurent, 1 campaign and 2 shows for Valentino, one campaign for Zara, and one campaign for Moschino, as well as walked for Alexander McQueen, Givenchy, Kenzo, Prada, Lanvin, Loewe, Miu Miu, Acne Studios, Tom Ford, Tory Burch, Jason Wu, Bottega Veneta, Anna Sui, Calvin Klein, JW Anderson, Simone Rocha, Burberry, Off-White, Ellery, Jil Sander, Giambattista Valli, Proenza Schouler and Versace.

She has shot editorials for American Vogue, British Vogue, Vogue Italia, Vogue Paris, I-D Magazine, Le Monde M Magazine, Modern Matter, Numéro, The Gentlewoman, WSJ., T Magazine and Vogue Australia. Akech has landed magazine covers for I-D Magazine, 10 Magazine Australia, Vogue Italia, British Vogue, Vogue Australia, Portrait, Elle Croatia, L'Officiel Singapore and Le Monde M Magazine. She is set to feature in the 2018 Pirelli Calendar, shot by Tim Walker, alongside Sasha Lane, Lil Yachty, Sean Combs, Whoopi Goldberg, RuPaul, Adwoa Aboah, Naomi Campbell and Slick Woods. She is set to be Melbourne Spring Fashion Week's ambassador for 2019.

Akech is currently ranked in the "Top 50" on models.com.

In 2019, Who magazine ran a feature about Akech but printed a picture of another model instead of her. Akech said that the error was "unacceptable and inexcusable" and felt that the "entire race has been disrespected." Who apologised to her for the error. In this year, Akech also started working with the United Nations Refugee Agency to help refugees. In her words, "Refugees are just like everyone else", and she would want to be a positive role model for people that are in similar situations to her upbringing.

After the pandemic restrictions were eased, Akech went back to work. In 2020, Adut Akech was featured beside Naomi Campbell in Beyonce's "Black Is King" for the song "Brown Skin Girl".

In 2022, Akech worked several fall fashion campaigns including Michael Kors and Victoria’s Secret. Akech was also one of 17 cover models featured on the September issue of The W Magazine as a part of their 50th Anniversary Issue.

Honours 

She was one of fifteen women selected to appear on the cover of the September 2019 issue of British Vogue, by guest editor Meghan, Duchess of Sussex.

On 2 December  2019, she won the 'Model of the Year' award at the British Fashion Awards in London.

References

External links 
 Adut Akech at Models.com
 Adut Akech at Instagram

1999 births
Living people
Australian female models
South Sudanese refugees
South Sudanese emigrants to Australia
South Sudanese female models
Australian models of South Sudanese descent
The Society Management models
Elite Model Management models
Refugees in Kenya
People from Adelaide